Events in the year 1922 in Portugal.

Incumbents
President: António José de Almeida
Prime Minister: António Maria da Silva

Events
29 January – Portuguese legislative election, 1922.

Arts and entertainment

Sports
31 March – first issue of Jornal Sporting
S.C. Beira-Mar founded
S.C. Lusitânia founded
Padroense F.C. founded
SC Bustelo founded
22 September – V.S.C. - Vitória Sport Clube founded

Births

3 May – Vasco Gonçalves, military officer and politician (died 2005)
10 November – Manuel Franco da Costa de Oliveira Falcão, Roman Catholic prelate, Bishop of Beja (died 2012).
José Saramago, novelist, poet, playwright, journalist and Nobel laureate (died 2010).

Deaths

References

 
1920s in Portugal
Years of the 20th century in Portugal